Talassia sandersoni is a species of very small sea snail, a marine gastropod mollusk in the family Vanikoridae.

Distribution

Description 
The maximum recorded shell length is 4 mm.

Habitat 
Minimum recorded depth is 260 m. Maximum recorded depth is 260 m.

References

External links

Vanikoridae
Gastropods described in 1884